Peter Matera (born 3 April 1969) is a former Australian rules footballer who played for the West Coast Eagles in the Australian Football League (AFL). 

Hailing from the West Australian country town of Wagin, Matera was born of an Italian father. He has seven siblings (Walter, Frank, Michael, Gino, Phillip, Gerard and Carmel), two of which were his older brother Wally Matera, and younger brother Phillip Matera, who both played football at the elite level. Matera played soccer as a youngster and was influenced by the success of Wally in playing Australian rules football.

Matera was recruited from South Fremantle in the West Australian Football League (WAFL) with the 4th selection in the 1989 National Draft and made his debut in 1990 for West Coast. Playing just five games in his debut season for the Eagles, Matera broke through as a star youngster in 1991, finishing fourth in the Brownlow Medal and earning All-Australian honors. Matera followed up with an excellent 1992, unlucky to miss AA honours once more but capped off the season with an outstanding finals series.

AFL career

Finest hour 
Peter Matera permanently etched his name into football folklore with his outstanding performance in the 1992 Grand Final. The West Coast Eagles captured their first premiership on the back of Matera's excellent five goal effort from the wing. The image of Matera "setting sail for home" is considered by many to be the definitive moment in West Coast history. Matera collected the Norm Smith Medal for his best on ground performance.

Prime of career 
Matera continued to establish himself as one of the games legitimate stars and most dangerous players throughout the mid-1990s. His outstanding goal sense and reading of the play made Matera a true game breaker. Selected as an All-Australian again in 1993 and 94, Matera also was something of a surprise runner up in the 1994 Brownlow Medal count, polling 28 votes, including four straight best of ground performances. Matera was also a key member of West Coast's second premiership team in 1994 – while he did not repeat his 1992 heroics, it was later revealed he played the Grand Final under much duress due to a stress fracture in his leg.

Moving back 
With his trademark speed on the decline, 1996 saw Peter Matera reinvent himself as a half back flank with great success. This part of his career is often overshadowed by his outstanding years as a wingman but Matera made a fine defender and once again enjoyed All-Australian status in 1996 and 1997. Matera was named on a wing in West Coast's team of the decade in 1996.

Brother Phil 
1996 also saw Matera joined at West Coast by his younger brother Phillip. A fine player in his own right, Phillip was a speedy forward pocket who emerged from his brother's shadow later in his career to be regarded as one of the better goal sneaks of his time. Affectionately known as "Fido", Phil Matera retired after the 2005 season playing 179 games and kicking 389 goals for West Coast.

Club Champion at last 
After four top five finishes in the strong West Coast team of the 1990s, Matera won his first Club Champion Award in 1997. Finishing two votes clear of fellow Eagles' champion Dean Kemp. Despite only winning the award once, Matera's consistency throughout the 1990s elevates his status amongst West Coast greats.

The Demon decision 
The most controversial moment of Peter Matera's career came in late 1997 when he shocked the football world by declaring his intentions to leave the West Coast Eagles and join the Melbourne Football Club via the pre-season draft for the 1998 season. Citing a desire to play more at the MCG, Matera's announcement triggered major public outcry in Western Australia and saw many of his longtime Eagles teammates, including captain John Worsfold visit Matera's home (which was staked out by the media). Days after news of Matera's defection broke, he did a back flip, agreeing to stay on at the West Coast Eagles. While he remained in the blue and gold for the rest of his career, many believed his form slump in 1998 was a result of the extreme pressure he was placed under as a result of his decision to originally leave the club.

Winding down 
Matera's form declined once he reached his 30s. Most of his premiership teammates retired around him leaving Matera one of only a handful of experienced Eagles left by the turn of the century – Matera was named a vice captain of the club in 1999, holding this position for three seasons. The team's fortunes took a turn for the worse in 2000 and 2001, missing the finals for the first time since 1989. Matera, while still finishing top 10 in the Club Champion award was not the outstanding performer he was in his prime. 2002 saw the return to the club of legendary Eagles captain John Worsfold, this time in the role of senior coach. Worsfold's return saw the side return to the finals and saw Matera, aged 33, regain some fine form and it appeared he may play on in 2003. To some surprise and disappointment, late in the preseason of 2003 Peter Matera drew the curtain on his illustrious career, succumbing to a persistent thigh injury which had rendered him unable to reach peak fitness.

Peter Matera played 253 games for the West Coast Eagles and kicked 218 goals over 13 seasons. He also played 60 games for South Fremantle and represented Western Australia in state football on 5 occasions.

Statistics

|-
|- style="background-color: #EAEAEA"
! scope="row" style="text-align:center" | 1990
|style="text-align:center;"|
| 37 || 5 || 3 || 3 || 45 || 16 || 61 || 16 || 3 || 0.6 || 0.6 || 9.0 || 3.2 || 12.2 || 3.2 || 0.6 || 0
|-
! scope="row" style="text-align:center" | 1991
|style="text-align:center;"|
| 30 || 26 || 32 || 25 || 401 || 134 || 535 || 87 || 56 || 1.2 || 1.0 || 15.4 || 5.2 || 20.6 || 3.3 || 2.2 || 18
|- style="background-color: #EAEAEA"
| scope=row bgcolor=F0E68C | 1992# || 
| 30 || 23 || 31 || 22 || 349 || 110 || 459 || 63 || 65 || 1.3 || 1.0 || 15.2 || 4.8 || 20.0 || 2.7 || 2.8 || 9
|-
! scope="row" style="text-align:center" | 1993
|style="text-align:center;"|
| 30 || 20 || 23 || 24 || 317 || 124 || 441 || 74 || 43 || 1.2 || 1.2 || 15.9 || 6.2 || 22.1 || 3.7 || 2.2 || 10
|- style="background-color: #EAEAEA"
| scope=row bgcolor=F0E68C | 1994# || 
| 30 || 24 || 21 || 20 || 305 || 108 || 413 || 77 || 68 || 0.9 || 0.8 || 12.7 || 4.5 || 17.2 || 3.2 || 2.8 || 28
|-
! scope="row" style="text-align:center" | 1995
|style="text-align:center;"|
| 30 || 20 || 31 || 15 || 284 || 82 || 366 || 74 || 40 || 1.6 || 0.8 || 14.2 || 4.1 || 18.3 || 3.7 || 2.0 || 13
|- style="background-color: #EAEAEA"
! scope="row" style="text-align:center" | 1996
|style="text-align:center;"|
| 30 || 24 || 9 || 10 || 339 || 119 || 458 || 98 || 71 || 0.4 || 0.4 || 14.1 || 5.0 || 19.1 || 4.1 || 3.0 || 9
|-
! scope="row" style="text-align:center" | 1997
|style="text-align:center;"|
| 30 || 21 || 7 || 8 || 336 || 132 || 468 || 93 || 39 || 0.3 || 0.4 || 16.0 || 6.3 || 22.3 || 4.4 || 1.9 || 21
|- style="background-color: #EAEAEA"
! scope="row" style="text-align:center" | 1998
|style="text-align:center;"|
| 30 || 21 || 17 || 13 || 294 || 81 || 375 || 76 || 55 || 0.8 || 0.6 || 14.0 || 3.9 || 17.9 || 3.6 || 2.6 || 6
|-
! scope="row" style="text-align:center" | 1999
|style="text-align:center;"|
| 30 || 16 || 8 || 6 || 196 || 92 || 288 || 71 || 37 || 0.5 || 0.4 || 12.3 || 5.8 || 18.0 || 4.4 || 2.3 || 8
|- style="background-color: #EAEAEA"
! scope="row" style="text-align:center" | 2000
|style="text-align:center;"|
| 30 || 17 || 22 || 12 || 216 || 88 || 304 || 63 || 39 || 1.3 || 0.7 || 12.7 || 5.2 || 17.9 || 3.7 || 2.3 || 1
|-
! scope="row" style="text-align:center" | 2001
|style="text-align:center;"|
| 30 || 19 || 2 || 4 || 245 || 67 || 312 || 69 || 42 || 0.1 || 0.2 || 12.9 || 3.5 || 16.4 || 3.6 || 2.2 || 3
|- style="background-color: #EAEAEA"
! scope="row" style="text-align:center" | 2002
|style="text-align:center;"|
| 30 || 17 || 11 || 4 || 212 || 76 || 288 || 44 || 57 || 0.6 || 0.2 || 12.5 || 4.5 || 16.9 || 2.6 || 3.4 || 0
|- class="sortbottom"
! colspan=3| Career
! 253
! 217
! 166
! 3539
! 1229
! 4768
! 905
! 615
! 0.9
! 0.7
! 14.0
! 4.9
! 18.9
! 3.6
! 2.4
! 126
|}

Honours and achievements
Team
 2× AFL premiership player: 1992, 1994
 2× McClelland Trophy: 1991, 1994

Individual
 Norm Smith Medal: 1992
 John Worsfold Medal: 1997
 5× All-Australian team: 1991, 1993, 1994, 1996, 1997
 4× State of Origin (Western Australia): 1991, 1992, 1993, 1997
 Australian Football League Indigenous Team of the Century 1904-2003 – Wing
Italian Team of the Century - Wing

Life after football 
In August 2005, Matera was named on the wing of the Indigenous Team of the Century. Matera said of the honour:

Stephen Michael was my idol as a kid, and we used to hear all about how good Polly Farmer was so to be recognised with them is an honor.

After leaving the football world following his retirement, Matera dabbled in coaching in South Western WA before signalling his intentions to return to the game in a larger capacity. Despite being linked by some to the vacant assistant coaching position at West Coast, Matera took on an assistant coaching and mentoring role at the East Perth Football Club in the WAFL for the 2006 season.

On 10 March 2006, Matera was inducted into the Western Australian Football Hall of Fame.

On 22 June 2006, Matera became the first ever career West Coast Eagle to be inducted into the Australian Football Hall of Fame. Considered one of the highest honours in Australian Football, Matera was pleased to receive the recognition

To be inducted in the highest level of football and accolades as in the Hall of Fame is one of those things that just caps off my career. This more or less finishes my career on a high.

In early 2015, the Matera Foundation was formed to assist Aboriginal Australians in finding employment.

In 2019, it was announced that Matera would join the AFL Tribunal in 2020.

In May 2022, Matera was rushed to hospital after suffering a heart attack.

References

External links 

Matera Foundation

1969 births
Living people
Australian people of Italian descent
Indigenous Australians from Western Australia
Norm Smith Medal winners
South Fremantle Football Club players
West Coast Eagles players
West Coast Eagles Premiership players
Western Australian Sports Star of the Year winners
All-Australians (AFL)
Australian Football Hall of Fame inductees
Western Australian State of Origin players
Indigenous Australian players of Australian rules football
John Worsfold Medal winners
Australian rules footballers from Western Australia
West Australian Football Hall of Fame inductees
People from Wagin, Western Australia
Two-time VFL/AFL Premiership players